The Kitchener Beavers were a Canadian professional ice hockey team in Kitchener, Ontario. They played in the Eastern Professional Hockey League from 1960-1962.

Results

External links
 The Internet Hockey Database

Ice hockey teams in Ontario
Sport in Kitchener, Ontario
Ice hockey clubs established in 1960
Sports clubs disestablished in 1962
1960 establishments in Ontario
1962 disestablishments in Ontario